The mayor of General Santos is the head of the local government of General Santos in South Cotabato, Philippines. The mayor's term is three years. The Mayor is the executive head and leads the city's departments in executing city ordinances and operating public services.

Ronnel Rivera became the incumbent mayor in 2013.

Functions and duties
The Local Government Code of 1991 outlines the functions and duties of the city mayor as follows:
Exercise general supervision and control over all programs, projects, services, and activities of the city government;
Enforce all laws and ordinances relative to the governance of the city and in the exercise of the appropriate corporate powers provided for under Section 22 of the Code, implement all approved policies, programs, projects, services and activities of the city;
Initiate and maximize the generation of resources and revenues, and apply the same to the implementation of development plans, program objectives and priorities as provided for under Section 18 of the Code, particularly those resources and revenues programmed for agro-industrial development and countryside growth and progress;
Ensure the delivery of basic services and the provision of adequate facilities as provided for under Section 17 of the Code;
Exercise such other powers and perform such other duties and functions as may be prescribed by law or ordinance.

List

Post-mayoral life
After leaving office, a number of mayors held various public positions and made an effort to remain in the limelight.
Rosalita Nuñez currently serves as member of the General Santos City Council since 2013, to expire in 2022.
Pedro B. Acharon, Jr. served as representative of South Cotabato's 1st congressional district from 2010 to 2019.

References

South Cotabato
General Santos
General Santos